Alison Starling-Alexander (born October 28, 1973)  is an American television news anchor and journalist. She is a co-anchor of WJLA-TV's weekday 4 PM and 5PM newscasts.

Early life
Starling is from Orlando, Florida.  She is from a military family and spent part of her childhood in the Washington D.C. metropolitan area while her father worked for the Office of the United States Trade Representative.  She later returned to DC to be a congressional intern. Per a DNA test she and her husband took, she is of mostly British and Irish descent. Starling graduated from University of Florida in 1995. She then earned a Cultural Ambassadorial Scholarship from Rotary International to study in Tours, France for six months in 1995.

Career

Early career
Starling career began at WDEF-TV in Chattanooga, Tennessee, as a reporter and anchor. She then worked for three years  at KIRO-TV in Seattle, Washington, where she covered the Seattle earthquake.

Current
Starling joined WJLA-TV in August 2003. One year later, she became co-anchor of Good Morning Washington (5-7AM) and ABC7 News at Noon. In 2005, Washingtonian named her one of the area's rising stars in local television news.

She was previously the co-anchor of the early morning program Good Morning Washington.

Personal
Starling met NBC News correspondent Peter Alexander in 2001. In August 2011 they became engaged in France. They married Saturday April 21, 2012, atop the Newseum in Washington, DC.

In February 2013 she announced her pregnancy, and shared that she was having a girl.

On December 11, 2014, the Washington Post noted that Starling was expecting the couple's second child. The couple is raising their children Jewish.

References

External links
 Alison Starling's bio on WJLA's website
 "Third time's the charm for Alison Starling," Alexandria Times July 2006 article
 Alison Starling speaks at valor awards
 "The true meaning of Scottish walk" by Alison Starling

American television journalists
American women television journalists
Living people
Television anchors from Washington, D.C.
University of Florida alumni
1973 births
21st-century American women